Love. It comes in all colors was an American television and print public service ad filmed in the space of one hour on Sunday afternoon, December 7, 1969 and broadcast on American TV stations during 1970. Sponsored by the National Urban Coalition, it was part of an advertising campaign to promote racial harmony and featured political activists as well as celebrities from sports, show business, government and business.

Background
Produced by the advertising agency Ketchum, MacLeod & Grove and filmed at Manhattan's MPO Studios, the one-minute commercial showed an assembled group singing several repetitions for chorus to "Let The Sun Shine In" from Hair.  The refrain speeds up as does the editing, trying to give everyone equal time and ends with applause by everyone.  The words "Love. It comes in all colors." are then superimposed upon the screen. It was broadcast as a public service advertisement during shows such as the March 8, 1970 episode of The Ed Sullivan Show (Ed Sullivan having been one of the participants).

The performance was staged by film director Joshua Logan and musical director Mitch Miller.

Amiri Baraka, one of the 117 invitees who came for the filming, was present in the studio during the production, but refused to appear on-camera. Among the numerous notables who were sent an invitation to the filming, 28 made known their willingness to participate, but did not arrive. These included Muhammad Ali, Julian Bond, Dick Gregory, John Lindsay and Sidney Poitier.

The youngest participant was 21-year-old Miss America 1970 Pamela Anne Eldred (although some members of the cast of the musical Hair, whose birth years remain unlisted, may have been younger) and the oldest were 75-year old trade unionist Jacob Potofsky and 74-year-old boxing champion Jack Dempsey, the only participants born in the 19th century. Five of the participants died within a five-year period following the filming: Whitney Young (March 1971), Ralph Bunche (December 1971), Dan Blocker (May 1972), Roberto Clemente (December 1972) and Chet Huntley (March 1974).

Participants

Actors
Robert Alda (1914–1986)
Eddie "Rochester" Anderson (1905–1977) 
Jim Backus (1913–1989)
Orson Bean (1928–2020)
Dan Blocker (1928–1972)
David Canary (1938–2015)
Peggy Cass (1924–1999)
Míriam Colón (1936–2017)
Roberto Contreras (1928–2000)
Ossie Davis (1917–2005) 
Ruby Dee (1922–2014)
Mildred Dunnock (1901–1991)
Geraldine Fitzgerald (1913–2005)
Henry Fonda (1905–1982)
Arlene Francis (1907–2001)
Will Geer (1902–1978)
Joel Grey (born 1932)
Anne Jackson (1925–2016)
Stacy Keach (born 1941)
Jack Klugman (1922–2012)
Myrna Loy (1905–1993)
Keye Luke (1904–1991)
Doug McClure (1935–1995)
Ali MacGraw (born 1939)
Butterfly McQueen (1911–1995)
Ray Martell, actor playing a small part in a 1969 episode of Mission Impossible TV series
Dina Merrill (1923–2017)
Greg Morris (1933–1996)
Mildred Natwick (1905–1994)
Leonard Nimoy (1931–2015)
Jerry Orbach (1935–2004)
Carl Reiner (1922-2020)
John Russell (1921–1991)
James Shigeta (1929–2014)
Gwen Verdon (1925–2000)
Eli Wallach (1915–2014)
Flip Wilson (1933–1998)

Television personalities
Johnny Carson (1925–2005)
Merv Griffin (1925–2007)
Chet Huntley (1911–1974)
Mitch Miller (1911–2010) [also conductor of the commercial's "Let the Sun Shine" song]
Ed Sullivan (1901–1974)
David Susskind (1920–1987)

Musical performers
Cannonball Adderley (1928–1975)
Bobby Capó (1922–1989)
Ray Charles [1930–2004)
Leontyne Price (born 1927)

Cast members of Hair
Obie Bray
Lorrie (Mary) Davis
Sally Eaton (born 1947)
Leata Galloway
Fluffer Hirsch
Pat Lambert
Cliff Lipson
Charles O. Lynch
Robin McNamara (born 1947)
Melba Moore (born 1945)
Cassandra Morgan
Allan Nicholls (born 1945)
Debbie Offner
Shelley Plimpton (born 1947)
George Tipton (1932–2016)
Singer Williams
Lillian Wong

Miss America 1970
Pamela Anne Eldred (born 1948)

Directors
Joshua Logan (1908–1988) [also the commercial's stage director]
Gordon Parks (1912–2006)

Sports figures
Roberto Clemente (1934–1972)
Bob Cousy (born 1928)
Jack Dempsey (1895–1983)
Danny Villanueva (1937–2015)

Public officials
Joseph Hugh Allen (1940–2008)
Joe J. Bernal (born 1927), Texas state senator
Ralph Bunche (1904–1971)
Lisle C. Carter (1925–2009)
Carlos D. Conde (born 1938), public affairs director for the Inter-Agency Committee on Mexican-American Affairs
John Conyers (born 1929)
Jerry Enomoto (1926–2016), first Asian American to head California Department of Corrections 
John W. Gardner (1912–2002)
Arthur Goldberg (1908–1990)
Richard Hatcher (1933–2019)
Daniel Inouye (1924–2012)
Earl Lucas (born 1938), elected mayor of Mississippi's African-American city Mound Bayou in 1969
Joseph Monserrat (1921–2005), president of New York City Board of Education leader in Latino community

Business executives
Frederick Close (1905–1989), Chairman of Alcoa
Andrew Heiskell (1915–2003)
John H. Johnson (1918–2005)
John D. Rockefeller III (1906–1978)
Franklin A. Thomas (born 1934)

Social leaders
Fernando Del Rio (born 1932), KCAL–TV reporter and director of communications for Southern California Association of Governments
James Farmer (1920–1999)
Herman Gallegos (born 1930), co-founder of National Council of La Raza
Fannie Lou Hamer (1917–1977)
Gus Heningburg (1930–2012), founding president of Greater Newark Urban Coalition and host of NBC's Positively Black 
Jacob Potofsky (1894–1979)
Bayard Rustin (1912–1987)
William Seneca (1927–1984), Native American leader; Seneca Nation treasurer (1966–68, 1970–71) and president (1968–70)
Abe Tapia (born 1934), president of California's Mexican American Political Association; 1970 candidate in 45th Assembly District
C. T. Vivian (born 1924)
Roy Wilkins (1901–1981)
Whitney Young (1921–1971)

Writers
Cleveland Amory (1917–1998)
Amiri Baraka (1934–2014) [was present during the filming, but refused to appear on-camera]
Topper Carew (born 1943), television writer, producer and director (Martin)
Harry Golden (1902–1981)
Bill Hosokawa (1915–2007)
Harry Kitano (1926–2002), scholar, musician and author

References

External links
Article from New York magazine

1970 in the United States
1970 works
Multiracial affairs in the United States
Public awareness campaigns
Public service announcements of the United States
1970 neologisms
American advertising slogans